Afadzato South District (a.k.a. Afadzato Anyigbe) is one of the eighteen districts in Volta Region, Ghana. Originally it was formerly part of the then-larger Hohoe District on 10 March 1989, until the southern part of the district was split off to create Afadzato South District on 28 June 2012; thus the remaining portion has been retained as Hohoe Municipal District. The district assembly is located in the northern part of Volta Region and has Ve Golokwati as its capital town.

Geography 
The District shares boundaries with Hohoe Municipal to the North, Kpando Municipal to the west, to the east with the Republic of Togo and to the south with Ho West District and South Dayi District respectively.

Villages 

Population and Distribution

The total population of the District according to the 2010 Population and Housing Census is about 95,030 with the male population numbering approximately  46,272, representing 48.7 percent and the female population numbering 48,758 constituting the remaining 51.3 percent. The population of the District forms 4.5 percent of the Regional population. The District has majority of its people in the rural areas (81.3%) compared to  (18.7%) in the urban areas.

Sources

References 

Districts of Volta Region